Lydiard Heneage Horton (1879 – January 19, 1945) was a consulting psychologist and author, who lectured and wrote about dream psychology, as well as World War I shell shock and trench nightmare.

Biography
Horton was born in London, the only child of Samuel Dana Horton (died 1895), a lawyer and writer on bimetalism, and an English mother, Blanche Harriot Lydiard (died 1898), who was born in India. Horton's childhood was spent in England, the United States, and Switzerland.

He died on January 19, 1945.

Legacy
His papers are collected at Columbia University.

Book
The Dream Problem and Mechanism of Thought, 1925

References

External links
Columbia Universities Library entry for Horton

American non-fiction writers
20th-century American psychologists
1879 births
1945 deaths
People in health professions from London
British emigrants to the United States